The 1790s (pronounced "seventeen-nineties") was a decade that began on January 1, 1790, and ended on December 31, 1799. Considered as some of the Industrial Revolution's earlier days, the 1790s called for the start of an anti-imperialist world, as new democracies such as the French First Republic and the United States began flourishing at this era. Revolutions – both political and social – forever transformed global politics and art, as wars such as the French Revolutionary Wars and the American Revolutionary War moulded modern-day concepts of liberalism, partisanship, elections, and the political compass. 

1790s also saw the beginning of the decline of Qing Dynasty.

Significant people
 President George Washington (United States)
 President John Adams (United States)
 Catherine the Great (Russia)
 Paul I of Russia
 Frederick William II of Prussia
 Frederick William III of Prussia
 Louis XVI of France
 Maximilien Robespierre (France)
 Napoleon (France)
 George III of the United Kingdom
 Prime Minister William Pitt the Younger (United Kingdom)
 Charles IV of Spain
 Leopold II, Holy Roman Emperor
 Francis II, Holy Roman Emperor
 Qianlong Emperor
 Jiaqing Emperor
 Pope Pius VI

See also
 List of state leaders in the 18th century

References